The Haenel RS9 is a bolt action sniper rifle manufactured by C.G. Haenel. It is the Bundeswehr's medium-range sniper rifle and replaces the Accuracy International AWM in the Kommando Spezialkräfte and Kommando Spezialkräfte Marine.

History
The order for the medium-range sniper rifle was put out to tender by the Bundeswehr in 2014. What was required was a "medium-range sniper weapon, consisting of a rifle, aiming and aiming aids, accessories and ammunition" as a bolt-action rifle for the precise single shot in .338 Lapua Magnum caliber including target optics and accessories.

The service description called for "use in areas with climate categories A1-3, B1-3 and C0-2 according to STANAG 4370 without restriction of functionality" and "adaptability for the night vision attachment (NSV) 80 introduced in the Bundeswehr", a caliber change through replacement barrels was not part of the service description. In addition to Haenel, Unique Alpine was shortlisted with the TPG-3 A4. Haenel was awarded the contract in February 2016 and is supplying the RS9 model as the G29 rifle. The first lot includes 115 weapons.

Users

 : Kommando Spezialkräfte and Kommando Spezialkräfte Marine (Bundeswehr designation G29) – .338 Lapua Magnum

References

External links

.338 Lapua Magnum rifles
Bolt-action rifles
Post–Cold War weapons of Germany
Sniper rifles of Germany
Weapons and ammunition introduced in 2016